Idol 2017 is the thirteenth season of the Swedish Idol series. This year, Anders Bagge returned as a judge after a two-year absence. Kishti Tomita returned as a judge as well, since her departure in 2007. Nikki Amini also returned as judge, having made her debut last season. Alexander Kronlund was the new judge. Pär Lernström returned as the host. Gina Dirawi joined as co-host.

Elimination chart

Top 13

Top 12 – Fridayparty

Top 11 – This is me

Top 10 – Love

Top 9 – Hits in Swedish

Top 8 – Duets 
The contestant marked in pink was eliminated, the contestant marked in lightblue was in the bottom two.

Top 7 – Classic Hits

Top 6 – Parent's Choice

Top 5 – Superstars

Top 4 – Listens & duets together with previous Idols contestants

Top 3 – Semifinal:  Jurys Choice

Top 2 – Final: Contestants Choice Viewers Choice Winners Single

References 

Idol (Swedish TV series)
2017 in Swedish music
2017 Swedish television seasons